The 2012 Dr McKenna Cup was a Gaelic football competition played under the auspices of Ulster GAA. The tournament was won by Tyrone, their first McKenna title since 2007. They defeated Derry in the final. The final was noted for the attendance of Northern Ireland First Minister Peter Robinson and Deputy First Minister Martin McGuinness.

See also
 2012 O'Byrne Cup
 2012 McGrath Cup

References

Dr McKenna Cup
Dr McKenna Cup
Dr McKenna Cup seasons